83 Ursae Majoris is a candidate binary star system in the northern circumpolar constellation of Ursa Major. It is a semiregular variable star, and it has been given the variable star designation IQ Ursae Majoris. It ranges in brightness from apparent visual magnitude 4.69 to 4.75. Percy and Au (1994) identified it as a small amplitude red variable with an irregular behavior, having a characteristic time scale of 20 days. The system is moving closer with a heliocentric radial velocity of −18.6 km/s.

The visible component is an evolved red giant with a stellar classification of M2 III. It is a marginal barium star, showing an enhanced abundance of s-process elements in its outer atmosphere. This material may have been acquired during a previous mass transfer from a now white dwarf companion, or self-enriched by a dredge-up during the asymptotic giant branch process.

References

External links
 83 Ursae Majoris (HIP 66738)

M-type giants
Semiregular variable stars
Ursa Major (constellation)
BD+55 1625
Ursae Majoris, 83
119228
066738
5154
Ursae Majoris, IQ
Barium stars